

Peerage of England

|Duke of Cornwall (1337)||none||1649||1688||
|-
|Duke of Norfolk (1483)||Thomas Howard, 5th Duke of Norfolk||1660||1677||The 23rd Earl of Arundel was restored to the Dukedom
|-
|rowspan="2"|Duke of Somerset (1547)||William Seymour, 2nd Duke of Somerset||1660||1660||Restored; also 1st Marquess of Hertford (1641); died
|-
|William Seymour, 3rd Duke of Somerset||1660||1671||
|-
|Duke of Buckingham (1623)||George Villiers, 2nd Duke of Buckingham||1628||1687||
|-
|rowspan="2"|Duke of Richmond (1641)||Esmé Stewart, 2nd Duke of Richmond||1655||1660||Died
|-
|Charles Stewart, 3rd Duke of Richmond||1660||1672||
|-
|Duke of Cumberland (1644)||Prince Rupert of the Rhine||1644||1682||
|-
|Duke of York (1644)||James Stuart||1644||1685||
|-
|Duke of Gloucester (1659)||Henry Stuart, Duke of Gloucester||1659||1660||Died, title extinct
|-
|Duke of Albemarle (1660)||George Monck, 1st Duke of Albemarle||1660||1670||New creation
|-
|Duke of Monmouth (1663)||James Scott, 1st Duke of Monmouth||1663||1685||New creation
|-
|Duke of Cambridge (1664)||James Stuart, Duke of Cambridge||1664||1667||New creation; died, title extinct
|-
|Duke of Newcastle-upon-Tyne (1665)||William Cavendish, 1st Duke of Newcastle-upon-Tyne||1665||1676||New creation for the 1st Marquess of Newcastle-upon-Tyne
|-
|Duke of Kendal (1666)||Charles Stuart, Duke of Kendal||1666||1667||New creation; died, title extinct
|-
|Duke of Cambridge (1667)||Edgar Stuart, Duke of Cambridge||1667||1671||New creation
|-
|Marquess of Winchester (1551)||John Paulet, 5th Marquess of Winchester||1628||1675||
|-
|rowspan="2"|Marquess of Worcester (1642)||Edward Somerset, 2nd Marquess of Worcester||1646||1667||Died
|-
|Henry Somerset, 3rd Marquess of Worcester||1667||1700||
|-
|Marquess of Dorchester (1645)||Henry Pierrepont, 1st Marquess of Dorchester||1645||1680||
|-
|Earl of Oxford (1142)||Aubrey de Vere, 20th Earl of Oxford||1632||1703||
|-
|rowspan="2"|Earl of Shrewsbury (1442)||Francis Talbot, 11th Earl of Shrewsbury||1654||1668||Died
|-
|Charles Talbot, 12th Earl of Shrewsbury||1668||1718||
|-
|Earl of Kent (1465)||Anthony Grey, 11th Earl of Kent||1651||1702||
|-
|Earl of Derby (1485)||Charles Stanley, 8th Earl of Derby||1651||1672||
|-
|Earl of Rutland (1525)||John Manners, 8th Earl of Rutland||1641||1679||
|-
|Earl of Huntingdon (1529)||Theophilus Hastings, 7th Earl of Huntingdon||1656||1701||
|-
|Earl of Southampton (1547)||Thomas Wriothesley, 4th Earl of Southampton||1624||1667||Died, title extinct
|-
|Earl of Bedford (1550)||William Russell, 5th Earl of Bedford||1641||1700||
|-
|rowspan="2"|Earl of Pembroke (1551)||Philip Herbert, 5th Earl of Pembroke||1649||1669||Died
|-
|William Herbert, 6th Earl of Pembroke||1669||1674||
|-
|Earl of Devon (1553)||William Courtenay, de jure 5th Earl of Devon||1638||1702||
|-
|rowspan="2"|Earl of Northumberland (1557)||Algernon Percy, 10th Earl of Northumberland||1632||1668||Died
|-
|Josceline Percy, 11th Earl of Northumberland||1668||1670||
|-
|rowspan="2"|Earl of Lincoln (1572)||Theophilus Clinton, 4th Earl of Lincoln||1619||1667||Died
|-
|Edward Clinton, 5th Earl of Lincoln||1667||1692||
|-
|Earl of Nottingham (1596)||Charles Howard, 3rd Earl of Nottingham||1642||1681||
|-
|Earl of Suffolk (1603)||James Howard, 3rd Earl of Suffolk||1640||1689||
|-
|Earl of Dorset (1604)||Richard Sackville, 5th Earl of Dorset||1657||1677||
|-
|Earl of Exeter (1605)||David Cecil, 3rd Earl of Exeter||1643||1678||
|-
|rowspan="2"|Earl of Salisbury (1605)||William Cecil, 2nd Earl of Salisbury||1612||1668||Died
|-
|James Cecil, 3rd Earl of Salisbury||1668||1683||
|-
|Earl of Bridgewater (1617)||John Egerton, 2nd Earl of Bridgewater||1649||1686||
|-
|Earl of Northampton (1618)||James Compton, 3rd Earl of Northampton||1643||1681||
|-
|Earl of Leicester (1618)||Robert Sidney, 2nd Earl of Leicester||1626||1677||
|-
|Earl of Warwick (1618)||Charles Rich, 4th Earl of Warwick||1659||1673||
|-
|Earl of Devonshire (1618)||William Cavendish, 3rd Earl of Devonshire||1628||1684||
|-
|Earl of Carlisle (1622)||James Hay, 2nd Earl of Carlisle||1636||1660||Died, title extinct
|-
|Earl of Denbigh (1622)||Basil Feilding, 2nd Earl of Denbigh||1643||1675||
|-
|Earl of Bristol (1622)||George Digby, 2nd Earl of Bristol||1653||1677||
|-
|Earl of Middlesex (1622)||Lionel Cranfield, 3rd Earl of Middlesex||1651||1674||
|-
|Earl of Anglesey (1623)||Charles Villiers, 2nd Earl of Anglesey||1630||1661||Died, title extinct
|-
|Earl of Holland (1624)||Robert Rich, 2nd Earl of Holland||1649||1675||
|-
|rowspan="2"|Earl of Clare (1624)||John Holles, 2nd Earl of Clare||1637||1666||Died
|-
|Gilbert Holles, 3rd Earl of Clare||1666||1689||
|-
|Earl of Bolingbroke (1624)||Oliver St John, 2nd Earl of Bolingbroke||1646||1688||
|-
|rowspan="2"|Earl of Westmorland (1624)||Mildmay Fane, 2nd Earl of Westmorland||1629||1666||Died
|-
|Charles Fane, 3rd Earl of Westmorland||1666||1691||
|-
|Earl of Cleveland (1626)||Thomas Wentworth, 1st Earl of Cleveland||1626||1667||Died, title extinct
|-
|Earl of Manchester (1626)||Edward Montagu, 2nd Earl of Manchester||1642||1671||
|-
|rowspan="2"|Earl of Marlborough (1626)||James Ley, 3rd Earl of Marlborough||1638||1665||Died
|-
|William Ley, 4th Earl of Marlborough||1665||1679||
|-
|Earl of Mulgrave (1626)||John Sheffield, 3rd Earl of Mulgrave||1658||1721||
|-
|rowspan="2"|Earl of Berkshire (1626)||Thomas Howard, 1st Earl of Berkshire||1626||1669||Died
|-
|Charles Howard, 2nd Earl of Berkshire||1669||1679||
|-
|Earl of Monmouth (1626)||Henry Carey, 2nd Earl of Monmouth||1639||1661||Died, title extinct
|-
|Earl Rivers (1626)||Thomas Savage, 3rd Earl Rivers||1654||1694||
|-
|rowspan="2"|Earl of Lindsey (1626)||Montagu Bertie, 2nd Earl of Lindsey||1642||1666||Died
|-
|Robert Bertie, 3rd Earl of Lindsey||1666||1701||
|-
|rowspan="2"|Earl of Dover (1628)||Henry Carey, 1st Earl of Dover||1628||1666||Died
|-
|John Carey, 2nd Earl of Dover||1666||1677||
|-
|Earl of Peterborough (1628)||Henry Mordaunt, 2nd Earl of Peterborough||1643||1697||
|-
|Earl of Stamford (1628)||Henry Grey, 1st Earl of Stamford||1628||1673||
|-
|Earl of Winchilsea (1628)||Heneage Finch, 3rd Earl of Winchilsea||1639||1689||
|-
|Earl of Carnarvon (1628)||Charles Dormer, 2nd Earl of Carnarvon||1643||1709||
|-
|rowspan="2"|Earl of Newport (1628)||Mountjoy Blount, 1st Earl of Newport||1628||1666||Died
|-
|Mountjoy Blount, 2nd Earl of Newport||1666||1675||
|-
|Earl of Chesterfield (1628)||Philip Stanhope, 2nd Earl of Chesterfield||1656||1714||
|-
|rowspan="2"|Earl of Thanet (1628)||John Tufton, 2nd Earl of Thanet||1632||1664||Died
|-
|Nicholas Tufton, 3rd Earl of Thanet||1664||1679||
|-
|rowspan="3"|Earl of Portland (1633)||Jerome Weston, 2nd Earl of Portland||1635||1663||Died
|-
|Charles Weston, 3rd Earl of Portland||1663||1665||Died
|-
|Thomas Weston, 4th Earl of Portland||1665||1668||
|-
|Earl of Strafford (1640)||William Wentworth, 2nd Earl of Strafford||1662||1695||Restored
|-
|Earl of Strafford (1641)||William Wentworth, 1st Earl of Strafford||1641||1695||Restored to Earldom of Strafford (1640), see above
|-
|Earl of Sunderland (1643)||Robert Spencer, 2nd Earl of Sunderland||1643||1702||
|-
|Earl of Sussex (1644)||James Savile, 2nd Earl of Sussex||1659||1671||
|-
|rowspan="2"|Earl of Norwich (1644)||George Goring, 1st Earl of Norwich||1644||1663||Died
|-
|Charles Goring, 2nd Earl of Norwich||1663||1671||
|-
|Earl of Scarsdale (1645)||Nicholas Leke, 2nd Earl of Scarsdale||1655||1681||
|-
|Earl of Lichfield (1645)||Charles Stewart, 1st Earl of Lichfield||1645||1672||Succeeded as Duke of Richmond, see above
|-
|Earl of Rochester (1652)||John Wilmot, 2nd Earl of Rochester||1658||1680||
|-
|Earl of St Albans (1660)||Henry Jermyn, 1st Earl of St Albans||1660||1684||New creation
|-
|Earl of Chesterfield (1660)||Katherine Stanhope, Countess of Chesterfield||1660||1667||New creation, for life only; died, title extinct
|-
|Earl of Sandwich (1660)||Edward Montagu, 1st Earl of Sandwich||1660||1672||New creation
|-
|Earl of Guilford (1660)||Elizabeth Boyle, Countess of Guilford||1660||1667||New creation, for life only; died, title extinct
|-
|Earl of Brecknock (1660)||James Butler, 1st Earl of Brecknock||1660||1688||New creation; Duke of Ormonde in the Peerage of Ireland
|-
|Earl of Anglesey (1661)||Arthur Annesley, 1st Earl of Anglesey||1661||1686||New creation
|-
|Earl of Bath (1661)||John Granville, 1st Earl of Bath||1661||1701||New creation
|-
|rowspan="2"|Earl of Cardigan (1661)||Thomas Brudenell, 1st Earl of Cardigan||1661||1663||New creation; died
|-
|Robert Brudenell, 2nd Earl of Cardigan||1663||1703||
|-
|Earl of Clarendon (1661)||Edward Hyde, 1st Earl of Clarendon||1661||1674||New creation; cr. Baron Hyde in 1660
|-
|Earl of Essex (1661)||Arthur Capell, 1st Earl of Essex||1661||1683||New creation
|-
|Earl of Carlisle (1661)||Charles Howard, 1st Earl of Carlisle||1661||1685||New creation
|-
|Earl of Craven (1664)||William Craven, 1st Earl of Craven||1664||1697||New creation
|-
|Earl of Falmouth (1664)||Charles Berkeley, 1st Earl of Falmouth||1664||1665||New creation; died, title extinct
|-
|Earl of Ailesbury (1664)||Robert Bruce, 1st Earl of Ailesbury||1664||1685||New creation; Earl of Elgin in the Peerage of Scotland
|-
|Earl of Burlington (1664)||Richard Boyle, 1st Earl of Burlington||1664||1698||New creation; Earl of Cork in the Peerage of Ireland
|-
|Viscount Hereford (1550)||Leicester Devereux, 6th Viscount Hereford||1658||1676||
|-
|Viscount Montagu (1554)||Francis Browne, 3rd Viscount Montagu||1629||1682||
|-
|rowspan="2"|Viscount Saye and Sele (1624)||William Fiennes, 1st Viscount Saye and Sele||1624||1662||Died
|-
|James Fiennes, 2nd Viscount Saye and Sele||1662||1674||
|-
|Viscount Conway (1627)||Edward Conway, 3rd Viscount Conway||1655||1683||
|-
|Viscount Campden (1628)||Baptist Noel, 3rd Viscount Campden||1643||1682||
|-
|Viscount Stafford (1640)||William Howard, 1st Viscount Stafford||1640||1680||
|-
|Viscount Fauconberg (1643)||Thomas Belasyse, 2nd Viscount Fauconberg||1652||1700||
|-
|Viscount Mordaunt (1659)||John Mordaunt, 1st Viscount Mordaunt||1659||1675||
|-
|Viscount Halifax (1668)||George Savile, 1st Viscount Halifax||1668||1695||New creation
|-
|Baron FitzWalter (1295)||Benjamin Mildmay, 17th Baron FitzWalter||1667||1679||Barony was dormant since 1629
|-
|Baron de Clifford (1299)||Anne Clifford, 14th Baroness de Clifford||1605||1676||
|-
|Baron Morley (1299)||Thomas Parker, 15th Baron Morley||1655||1697||
|-
|rowspan="2"|Baron Dacre (1321)||Francis Lennard, 14th Baron Dacre||1630||1662||Died
|-
|Thomas Lennard, 15th Baron Dacre||1662||1715||
|-
|Baron Grey of Ruthyn (1325)||Susan Longueville, 13th Baroness Grey de Ruthyn||1643||1676||
|-
|Baron Darcy de Knayth (1332)||Conyers Darcy, 8th Baron Darcy de Knayth||1653||1689||
|-
|Baron Berkeley (1421)||George Berkeley, 9th Baron Berkeley||1658||1698||
|-
|Baron Dudley (1440)||Frances Ward, 6th Baroness Dudley||1643||1697||
|-
|Baron Stourton (1448)||William Stourton, 11th Baron Stourton||1633||1672||
|-
|rowspan="2"|Baron Willoughby de Broke (1491)||Greville Verney, 9th Baron Willoughby de Broke||1648||1668||Died
|-
|William Verney, 10th Baron Willoughby de Broke||1668||1683||
|-
|Baron Monteagle (1514)||Thomas Parker, 6th Baron Monteagle||1655||1697||
|-
|rowspan="2"|Baron Vaux of Harrowden (1523)||Edward Vaux, 4th Baron Vaux of Harrowden||1595||1661||Died
|-
|Henry Vaux, 5th Baron Vaux of Harrowden||1661||1663||Died, Barony fell into abeyance until 1838
|-
|rowspan="2"|Baron Sandys of the Vine (1529)||William Sandys, 6th Baron Sandys||1645||1668||Died
|-
|Henry Sandys, 7th Baron Sandys||1668||1680||
|-
|Baron Windsor (1529)||Thomas Hickman-Windsor, 7th Baron Windsor||1660||1687||Abeyance terminated
|-
|Baron Wentworth (1529)||Henrietta Wentworth, 6th Baroness Wentworth||1667||1686||Barony previously held by the Earl of Cleveland
|-
|Baron Eure (1544)||George Eure, 6th Baron Eure||1652||1672||
|-
|Baron Wharton (1545)||Philip Wharton, 4th Baron Wharton||1625||1695||
|-
|rowspan="2"|Baron Willoughby of Parham (1547)||Francis Willoughby, 5th Baron Willoughby of Parham||1618||1666||Died
|-
|William Willoughby, 6th Baron Willoughby of Parham||1666||1673||
|-
|Baron Paget (1552)||William Paget, 5th Baron Paget||1629||1678||
|-
|rowspan="2"|Baron North (1554)||Dudley North, 3rd Baron North||1600||1666||Died
|-
|Dudley North, 4th Baron North||1666||1677||
|-
|Baron Chandos (1554)||William Brydges, 7th Baron Chandos||1655||1676||
|-
|Baron De La Warr (1570)||Charles West, 5th Baron De La Warr||1628||1687||
|-
|Baron Norreys (1572)||James Bertie, 5th Baron Norreys||1657||1699||
|-
|rowspan="2"|Baron Gerard (1603)||Charles Gerard, 4th Baron Gerard||1640||1667||Died
|-
|Digby Gerard, 5th Baron Gerard||1667||1684||
|-
|Baron Petre (1603)||William Petre, 4th Baron Petre||1638||1684||
|-
|Baron Arundell of Wardour (1605)||Henry Arundell, 3rd Baron Arundell of Wardour||1643||1694||
|-
|Baron Stanhope of Harrington (1605)||Charles Stanhope, 2nd Baron Stanhope||1621||1675||
|-
|Baron Clifton (1608)||Mary Butler, 5th Baroness Clifton||1660||1668||Title previously held by the Dukes of Lennox; died, title succeeded by the Duke of Lennox
|-
|Baron Teynham (1616)||John Roper, 3rd Baron Teynham||1628||1673||
|-
|Baron Brooke (1621)||Robert Greville, 4th Baron Brooke||1658||1677||
|-
|Baron Montagu of Boughton (1621)||Edward Montagu, 2nd Baron Montagu of Boughton||1644||1684||
|-
|Baron Grey of Warke (1624)||William Grey, 1st Baron Grey of Werke||1624||1674||
|-
|Baron Robartes (1625)||John Robartes, 2nd Baron Robartes||1625||1685||
|-
|Baron Craven (1627)||Willian Craven, 1st Baron Craven||1627||1697||Created Earl of Craven, see above
|-
|Baron Lovelace (1627)||John Lovelace, 2nd Baron Lovelace||1634||1670||
|-
|rowspan="2"|Baron Poulett (1627)||John Poulett, 2nd Baron Poulett||1649||1665||Died
|-
|John Poulett, 3rd Baron Poulett||1665||1679||
|-
|Baron Clifford (1628)||Elizabeth Boyle, Baroness Clifford||1643||1691||
|-
|Baron Brudenell (1628)||Thomas Brudenell, 1st Baron Brudenell||1628||1663||Created Earl of Cardigan, see above
|-
|Baron Maynard (1628)||William Maynard, 2nd Baron Maynard||1640||1699||
|-
|rowspan="2"|Baron Coventry (1628)||Thomas Coventry, 2nd Baron Coventry||1640||1661||Died
|-
|George Coventry, 3rd Baron Coventry||1661||1680||
|-
|rowspan="2"|Baron Mohun of Okehampton (1628)||Warwick Mohun, 2nd Baron Mohun of Okehampton||1640||1665||Died
|-
|Charles Mohun, 3rd Baron Mohun of Okehampton||1665||1677||
|-
|rowspan="2"|Baron Powis (1629)||Percy Herbert, 2nd Baron Powis||1655||1667||Died
|-
|William Herbert, 3rd Baron Powis||1667||1696||
|-
|Baron Herbert of Chirbury (1629)||Edward Herbert, 3rd Baron Herbert of Chirbury||1655||1678||
|-
|Baron Finch (1640)||John Finch, 1st Baron Finch||1640||1660||Died, title extinct
|-
|Baron (A)bergavenny (1641)||John Nevill, 1st Baron Bergavenny||1641||1662||Died, title extinct
|-
|rowspan="3"|Baron Seymour of Trowbridge (1641)||Francis Seymour, 1st Baron Seymour of Trowbridge||1641||1664||
|-
|Charles Seymour, 2nd Baron Seymour of Trowbridge||1664||1665||Died
|-
|Francis Seymour, 3rd Baron Seymour of Trowbridge||1665||1678||
|-
|Baron Capell of Hadham (1641)||Arthur Capell, 2nd Baron Capell of Hadham||1649||1683||Created Earl of Essex, see above
|-
|Baron Hatton (1642)||Christopher Hatton, 1st Baron Hatton||1642||1670||
|-
|Baron Newport (1642)||Francis Newport, 2nd Baron Newport||1651||1708||
|-
|Baron Leigh (1643)||Thomas Leigh, 1st Baron Leigh||1643||1672||
|-
|Baron Jermyn (1643)||Henry Jermyn, 1st Baron Jermyn||1643||1684||Created Earl of St Albans, see above
|-
|Baron Byron (1643)||Richard Byron, 2nd Baron Byron||1652||1679||
|-
|Baron Loughborough (1643)||Henry Hastings, 1st Baron Loughborough||1643||1667||Died, title extinct
|-
|Baron Widdrington (1643)||William Widdrington, 2nd Baron Widdrington||1651||1675||
|-
|Baron Ward (1644)||Humble Ward, 1st Baron Ward||1644||1670||
|-
|rowspan="2"|Baron Colepeper (1644)||John Colepeper, 1st Baron Colepeper||1644||1660||Died
|-
|Thomas Colepeper, 2nd Baron Colepeper||1660||1689||
|-
|rowspan="2"|Baron Astley of Reading (1644)||Isaac Astley, 2nd Baron Astley of Reading||1652||1662||Died
|-
|Jacob Astley, 3rd Baron Astley of Reading||1662||1688||
|-
|Baron Cobham (1645)||John Brooke, 1st Baron Cobham||1645||1660||Died, title extinct
|-
|Baron Lucas of Shenfield (1645)||John Lucas, 1st Baron Lucas of Shenfield||1645||1671||
|-
|Baron Belasyse (1645)||John Belasyse, 1st Baron Belasyse||1645||1689||
|-
|Baron Rockingham (1645)||Edward Watson, 2nd Baron Rockingham||1653||1689||
|-
|Baron Gerard of Brandon (1645)||Charles Gerard, 1st Baron Gerard of Brandon||1645||1694||
|-
|rowspan="2"|Baron Lexinton (1645)||Robert Sutton, 1st Baron Lexinton||1645||1668||Died
|-
|Robert Sutton, 2nd Baron Lexinton||1668||1723||
|-
|Baron Wotton (1650)||Charles Kirkhoven, 1st Baron Wotton||1650||1683||
|-
|rowspan="2"|Baron Langdale (1658)||Marmaduke Langdale, 1st Baron Langdale||1658||1661||
|-
|Marmaduke Langdale, 2nd Baron Langdale||1661||1703||
|-
|Baron Crofts (1658)||William Crofts, 1st Baron Crofts||1658||1677||
|-
|Baron Berkeley of Stratton (1658)||John Berkeley, 1st Baron Berkeley of Stratton||1658||1678||
|-
|Baron Ashley (1661)||Anthony Ashley Cooper, 1st Baron Ashley||1661||1683||New creation
|-
|rowspan="2"|Baron Cornwallis (1661)||Frederick Cornwallis, 1st Baron Cornwallis||1661||1662||New creation; died
|-
|Charles Cornwallis, 2nd Baron Cornwallis||1662||1673||
|-
|Baron Crew (1661)||John Crew, 1st Baron Crew||1661||1679||New creation
|-
|Baron Delamer (1661)||George Booth, 1st Baron Delamer||1661||1684||New creation
|-
|Baron Holles (1661)||Denzil Holles, 1st Baron Holles||1661||1680||New creation
|-
|Baron Townshend (1661)||Horatio Townshend, 1st Baron Townshend||1661||1687||New creation
|-
|rowspan="2"|Baron (A)bergavenny (1662)||George Nevill, 11th Baron Bergavenny||Aft. 1662||1666||New creation; died
|-
|George Nevill, 12th Baron Bergavenny||1666||1695||
|-
|Baron Lucas of Crudwell (1663)||Mary Grey, 1st Baroness Lucas||1663||1702||New creation
|-
|Baron Arundell of Trerice (1664)||Richard Arundell, 1st Baron Arundell of Trerice||1664||1687||New creation
|-
|Baron Arlington (1664)||Henry Bennet, 1st Baron Arlington||1664||1685||New creation
|-
|Baron Frescheville (1665)||John Frescheville, 1st Baron Frescheville||1665||1682||New creation
|-
|Baron Howard of Castle Rising (1669)||Henry Howard, 1st Baron Howard of Castle Rising||1669||1684||New creation
|-
|}

Peerage of Scotland

|Duke of Rothesay (1398)||none||1649||1688||
|-
|rowspan=2|Duke of Lennox (1581)||Esmé Stewart, 5th Duke of Lennox||1655||1660||Died
|-
|Charles Stewart, 6th Duke of Lennox||1660||1672||
|-
|Duke of Hamilton (1643)||Anne Hamilton, 3rd Duchess of Hamilton||1651||1698||
|-
|Duke of Albany (1660)||Prince James, Duke of Albany||1660||1685||New creation
|-
|Duke of Buccleuch (1663)||Anne Scott, 1st Duchess of Buccleuch||1663||1732||New creation
|-
|Marquess of Huntly (1599)||George Gordon, 4th Marquess of Huntly||1653||1716||
|-
|rowspan=2|Marquess of Douglas (1633)||William Douglas, 1st Marquess of Douglas||1633||1660||Died
|-
|James Douglas, 2nd Marquess of Douglas||1660||1700||
|-
|Marquess of Argyll (1641)||Archibald Campbell, 1st Marquess of Argyll||1641||1661||Attainted and all his honours forfeit
|-
|rowspan=2|Marquess of Montrose (1644)||James Graham, 2nd Marquess of Montrose||1650||1669||Died
|-
|James Graham, 3rd Marquess of Montrose||1669||1684||
|-
|Earl of Argyll (1457)||Archibald Campbell, 9th Earl of Argyll||1663||1685||Restored to the Earldom
|-
|Earl of Crawford (1398)||John Lindsay, 17th Earl of Crawford||1652||1678||
|-
|Earl of Erroll (1452)||Gilbert Hay, 11th Earl of Erroll||1636||1674||
|-
|Earl Marischal (1458)||William Keith, 7th Earl Marischal||1635||1671||
|-
|Earl of Sutherland (1235)||John Gordon, 14th Earl of Sutherland||1615||1679||
|-
|rowspan=2|Earl of Mar (1114)||John Erskine, Earl of Mar||1654||1668||Died
|-
|Charles Erskine, Earl of Mar||1668||1689||
|-
|Earl of Rothes (1458)||John Leslie, 7th Earl of Rothes||1641||1681||
|-
|Earl of Morton (1458)||William Douglas, 9th Earl of Morton||1649||1681||
|-
|rowspan=2|Earl of Menteith (1427)||William Graham, 7th Earl of Menteith||1598||1661||Died
|-
|William Graham, 8th Earl of Menteith||1661||1694||
|-
|rowspan=2|Earl of Glencairn (1488)||William Cunningham, 9th Earl of Glencairn||1631||1664||Died
|-
|Alexander Cunningham, 10th Earl of Glencairn||1664||1670||
|-
|rowspan=3|Earl of Eglinton (1507)||Alexander Montgomerie, 6th Earl of Eglinton||1612||1661||Died
|-
|Hugh Montgomerie, 7th Earl of Eglinton||1661||1669||Died
|-
|Alexander Montgomerie, 8th Earl of Eglinton||1669||1701||
|-
|rowspan=2|Earl of Cassilis (1509)||John Kennedy, 6th Earl of Cassilis||1615||1668||Died
|-
|John Kennedy, 7th Earl of Cassilis||1668||1701||
|-
|Earl of Caithness (1455)||George Sinclair, 6th Earl of Caithness||1643||1672||
|-
|rowspan=2|Earl of Buchan (1469)||James Erskine, 7th Earl of Buchan||1628||1664||Died
|-
|William Erskine, 8th Earl of Buchan||1664||1695||
|-
|Earl of Moray (1562)||Alexander Stuart, 5th Earl of Moray||1653||1701||
|-
|Earl of Linlithgow (1600)||George Livingston, 3rd Earl of Linlithgow||1650||1690||
|-
|Earl of Winton (1600)||George Seton, 4th Earl of Winton||1650||1704||
|-
|rowspan=2|Earl of Home (1605)||James Home, 3rd Earl of Home||1633||1666||Died
|-
|Alexander Home, 4th Earl of Home||1666||1674||
|-
|rowspan=2|Earl of Perth (1605)||John Drummond, 2nd Earl of Perth||1611||1662||Died
|-
|James Drummond, 3rd Earl of Perth||1662||1675||
|-
|Earl of Dunfermline (1605)||Charles Seton, 2nd Earl of Dunfermline||1622||1672||
|-
|rowspan=3|Earl of Wigtown (1606)||John Fleming, 3rd Earl of Wigtown||1650||1665||Died
|-
|John Fleming, 4th Earl of Wigtown||1665||1668||Died
|-
|William Fleming, 5th Earl of Wigtown||1668||1681||
|-
|Earl of Abercorn (1606)||James Hamilton, 2nd Earl of Abercorn||1618||1670||
|-
|Earl of Kinghorne (1606)||Patrick Lyon, 3rd Earl of Kinghorne||1646||1695||
|-
|Earl of Roxburghe (1616)||William Ker, 2nd Earl of Roxburghe||1650||1675||
|-
|Earl of Kellie (1619)||Alexander Erskine, 3rd Earl of Kellie||1643||1677||
|-
|rowspan=2|Earl of Buccleuch (1619)||Mary Scott, 3rd Countess of Buccleuch||1651||1661||Died
|-
|Anne Scott, 4th Countess of Buccleuch||1661||1732||Created Duchess of Buccleuch, see above
|-
|rowspan=2|Earl of Haddington (1619)||John Hamilton, 4th Earl of Haddington||1645||1669||Died
|-
|Charles Hamilton, 5th Earl of Haddington||1669||1685||
|-
|rowspan=2|Earl of Nithsdale (1620)||Robert Maxwell, 2nd Earl of Nithsdale||1646||1667||Died
|-
|John Maxwell, 3rd Earl of Nithsdale||1667||1677||
|-
|Earl of Galloway (1623)||James Stewart, 2nd Earl of Galloway||1649||1671||
|-
|Earl of Seaforth (1623)||Kenneth Mackenzie, 3rd Earl of Seaforth||1651||1678||
|-
|Earl of Lauderdale (1624)||John Maitland, 2nd Earl of Lauderdale||1645||1682||
|-
|Earl of Tullibardine (1628)||James Murray, 2nd Earl of Tullibardine||1644||1670||
|-
|Earl of Atholl (1629)||John Murray, 2nd Earl of Atholl||1642||1703||
|-
|Earl of Lothian (1631)||William Kerr, 1st Earl of Lothian||1631||1675||
|-
|rowspan=2|Earl of Airth (1633)||William Graham, 1st Earl of Airth||1633||1661||Died
|-
|William Graham, 2nd Earl of Airth||1661||1694||
|-
|rowspan=2|Earl of Loudoun (1633)||John Campbell, 1st Earl of Loudoun||1633||1662||Died
|-
|James Campbell, 2nd Earl of Loudoun||1662||1684||
|-
|Earl of Kinnoull (1633)||William Hay, 4th Earl of Kinnoull||1650||1677||
|-
|Earl of Dumfries (1633)||William Crichton, 2nd Earl of Dumfries||1643||1691||
|-
|Earl of Queensberry (1633)||James Douglas, 2nd Earl of Queensberry||1640||1671||
|-
|Earl of Stirling (1633)||Henry Alexander, 4th Earl of Stirling||1644||1691||
|-
|rowspan=2|Earl of Elgin (1633)||Thomas Bruce, 1st Earl of Elgin||1633||1663||Died
|-
|Robert Bruce, 2nd Earl of Elgin||1663||1685||
|-
|rowspan=2|Earl of Southesk (1633)||James Carnegie, 2nd Earl of Southesk||1658||1669||Died
|-
|Robert Carnegie, 3rd Earl of Southesk||1669||1688||
|-
|rowspan=2|Earl of Traquair (1633)||John Stewart, 2nd Earl of Traquair||1659||1666||Died
|-
|William Stewart, 3rd Earl of Traquair||1666||1673||
|-
|Earl of Ancram (1633)||Charles Kerr, 2nd Earl of Ancram||1654||1690||
|-
|Earl of Wemyss (1633)||David Wemyss, 2nd Earl of Wemyss||1649||1679||
|-
|Earl of Dalhousie (1633)||William Ramsay, 1st Earl of Dalhousie||1633||1672||
|-
|Earl of Findlater (1638)||James Ogilvy, 3rd Earl of Findlater||1658||1711||
|-
|rowspan=2|Earl of Airlie (1639)||James Ogilvy, 1st Earl of Airlie||1639||1665||Died
|-
|James Ogilvy, 2nd Earl of Airlie||1665||1703||
|-
|Earl of Carnwath (1639)||Gavin Dalzell, 2nd Earl of Carnwath||1654||1674||
|-
|Earl of Callendar (1641)||James Livingston, 1st Earl of Callendar||1641||1674||
|-
|rowspan=3|Earl of Leven (1641)||Alexander Leslie, 1st Earl of Leven||1641||1661||
|-
|Alexander Leslie, 2nd Earl of Leven||1661||1664||Died
|-
|Margaret Leslie, Countess of Leven||1664||1674||
|-
|Earl of Hartfell (1643)||James Johnstone, 1st Earl of Annandale and Hartfell||1655||1672||Resigned the Earldom, regranted, see below
|-
|Earl of Dysart (1643)||Elizabeth Tollemache, 2nd Countess of Dysart||1654||1698||
|-
|rowspan=2|Earl of Panmure (1646)||Patrick Maule, 1st Earl of Panmure||1646||1661||Died
|-
|George Maule, 2nd Earl of Panmure||1661||1671||
|-
|Earl of Selkirk (1646)||William Hamilton, 1st Earl of Selkirk||1646||1694||
|-
|Earl of Tweeddale (1646)||John Hay, 2nd Earl of Tweeddale||1653||1697||
|-
|rowspan=2|Earl of Northesk (1647)||John Carnegie, 1st Earl of Northesk||1647||1667||Died
|-
|David Carnegie, 2nd Earl of Northesk||1667||1679||
|-
|rowspan=2|Earl of Kincardine (1647)||Edward Bruce, 1st Earl of Kincardine||1647||1662||Died
|-
|Alexander Bruce, 2nd Earl of Kincardine||1662||1680||
|-
|rowspan=2|Earl of Balcarres (1651)||Charles Lindsay, 2nd Earl of Balcarres||1659||1662||Died
|-
|Colin Lindsay, 3rd Earl of Balcarres||1662||1722||
|-
|Earl of Tarras (1660)||Walter Scott, Earl of Tarras||1660||1693||New creation, life peerage
|-
|Earl of Aboyne (1660)||Charles Gordon, 1st Earl of Aboyne||1660||1681||New creation
|-
|Earl of Middleton (1660)||John Middleton, 1st Earl of Middleton||1660||1674||New creation
|-
|Earl of Newburgh (1660)||James Levingston, 1st Earl of Newburgh||1660||1670||New creation
|-
|Earl of Dundee (1660)||John Scrymgeour, 1st Earl of Dundee||1660||1668||New creation; died, title dormant until 1953
|-
|Earl of Annandale and Hartfell (1661)||James Johnstone, 1st Earl of Annandale and Hartfell||1661||1672||New creation
|-
|Earl of Kilmarnock (1661)||William Boyd, 1st Earl of Kilmarnock||1661||1692||New creation
|-
|Earl of Forfar (1661)||Archibald Douglas, 1st Earl of Forfar||1661||1712||New creation
|-
|Earl of Teviot (1663)||Andrew Rutherford, 1st Earl of Teviot||1663||1664||New creation; died, title extinct
|-
|Earl of Dundonald (1669)||William Cochrane, 1st Earl of Dundonald||1669||1685||New creation
|-
|rowspan=2|Viscount of Falkland (1620)||Henry Cary, 4th Viscount of Falkland||1649||1663||Died
|-
|Anthony Cary, 5th Viscount of Falkland||1663||1694||
|-
|rowspan=2|Viscount of Dunbar (1620)||John Constable, 2nd Viscount of Dunbar||1645||1668||Died
|-
|Robert Constable, 3rd Viscount of Dunbar||1668||1714||
|-
|rowspan=2|Viscount of Stormont (1621)||David Murray, 4th Viscount of Stormont||1658||1668||Died
|-
|David Murray, 5th Viscount of Stormont||1668||1731||
|-
|rowspan=2|Viscount of Kenmure (1633)||Robert Gordon, 4th Viscount of Kenmure||1643||1663||Died
|-
|Alexander Gordon, 5th Viscount of Kenmure||1663||1698||
|-
|Viscount of Arbuthnott (1641)||Robert Arbuthnot, 2nd Viscount of Arbuthnott||1655||1682||
|-
|Viscount of Dudhope (1641)||John Scrymgeour, 3rd Viscount of Dudhope||1644||1668||Created Earl of Dundee, see above
|-
|Viscount of Frendraught (1642)||James Crichton, 2nd Viscount of Frendraught||1650||1678||
|-
|Viscount of Newburgh (1647)||James Levingston, 1st Viscount of Newburgh||1647||1670||Created Earl of Newburgh, see above
|-
|rowspan=2|Viscount of Oxfuird (1651)||James Makgill, 1st Viscount of Oxfuird||1651||1663||Died
|-
|Robert Makgill, 2nd Viscount of Oxfuird||1663||1706||
|-
|Viscount of Kingston (1651)||Alexander Seton, 1st Viscount of Kingston||1651||1691||
|-
|rowspan=3|Viscount of Irvine (1661)||Henry Ingram, 1st Viscount of Irvine||1661||1666||New creation; died
|-
|Edward Ingram, 2nd Viscount of Irvine||1666||1668||Died
|-
|Arthur Ingram, 3rd Viscount of Irvine||1668||1702||
|-
|rowspan=2|Viscount of Kilsyth (1661)||James Livingston, 1st Viscount of Kilsyth||1661||1661||New creation; died
|-
|James Livingston, 2nd Viscount of Kilsyth||1661||1706||
|-
|Lord Somerville (1430)||James Somerville, 10th Lord Somerville||1640||1677||
|-
|Lord Forbes (1442)||Alexander Forbes, 10th Lord Forbes||1641||1672||
|-
|rowspan=3|Lord Saltoun (1445)||Alexander Abernethy, 9th Lord Saltoun||1612||1668||Died
|-
|Margaret Abernethy, 10th Lady Saltoun||1668||1669||Died
|-
|Alexander Fraser, 11th Lord Saltoun||1669||1693||
|-
|rowspan=2|Lord Gray (1445)||Andrew Gray, 7th Lord Gray||1611||1663||Died
|-
|Patrick Gray, 8th Lord Gray||1663||1711||
|-
|Lord Sinclair (1449)||John Sinclair, 9th Lord Sinclair||1615||1676||
|-
|Lord Borthwick (1452)||John Borthwick, 9th Lord Borthwick||1623||1675||
|-
|Lord Boyd (1454)||William Boyd, 10th Lord Boyd||1654||1692||Created Earl of Kilmarnock, see above
|-
|Lord Oliphant (1455)||Patrick Oliphant, 6th Lord Oliphant||1631||1680||
|-
|Lord Cathcart (1460)||Alan Cathcart, 6th Lord Cathcart||1628||1709||
|-
|Lord Lovat (1464)||Hugh Fraser, 8th Lord Lovat||1646||1672||
|-
|Lord Sempill (1489)||Robert Sempill, 7th Lord Sempill||1644||1675||
|-
|Lord Herries of Terregles (1490)||John Maxwell, 7th Lord Herries of Terregles||1631||1677||Succeeded as the 3rd Earl of Nithsdale, see above
|-
|Lord Ross (1499)||George Ross, 11th Lord Ross||1656||1682||
|-
|rowspan=2|Lord Elphinstone (1509)||Alexander Elphinstone, 7th Lord Elphinstone||1654||1669||
|-
|John Elphinstone, 8th Lord Elphinstone||1669||1718||
|-
|Lord Ochiltree (1543)||William Stewart, 5th Lord Ochiltree||1658||1675||
|-
|Lord Torphichen (1564)||Walter Sandilands, 6th Lord Torphichen||1649||1696||
|-
|Lord Spynie (1590)||George Lindsay, 3rd Lord Spynie||1646||1671||
|-
|rowspan=2|Lord Lindores (1600)||James Leslie, 3rd Lord Lindores||1649||1666||Died
|-
|John Leslie, 4th Lord Lindores||1666||1706||
|-
|Lord Colville of Culross (1604)||John Colville, 4th Lord Colville of Culross||1656||1680||
|-
|Lord Balmerinoch (1606)||John Elphinstone, 3rd Lord Balmerino||1649||1704||
|-
|Lord Blantyre (1606)||Alexander Stewart, 4th Lord Blantyre||1641||1670||
|-
|Lord Coupar (1607)||James Elphinstone, 1st Lord Coupar||1607||1669||Died, title succeeded by the Lord Balmerinoch, see above
|-
|rowspan=2|Lord Balfour of Burleigh (1607)||Robert Balfour, 2nd Lord Balfour of Burleigh||1619||1663||Died
|-
|John Balfour, 3rd Lord Balfour of Burleigh||1663||1688||
|-
|rowspan=2|Lord Cranstoun (1609)||William Cranstoun, 3rd Lord Cranstoun||1648||1664||Died
|-
|James Cranstoun, 4th Lord Cranstoun||1664||1688||
|-
|Lord Maderty (1609)||David Drummond, 3rd Lord Madderty||1647||1692||
|-
|Lord Dingwall (1609)||Elizabeth Preston, 2nd Lady Dingwall||1628||1684||
|-
|Lord Cardross (1610)||David Erskine, 2nd Lord Cardross||1634||1671||
|-
|Lord Melville of Monymaill (1616)||George Melville, 4th Lord Melville||1643||1707||
|-
|Lord Aston of Forfar (1627)||Walter Aston, 2nd Lord Aston of Forfar||1639||1678||
|-
|Lord Fairfax of Cameron (1627)||Thomas Fairfax, 3rd Lord Fairfax of Cameron||1648||1671||
|-
|rowspan=2|Lord Napier (1627)||Archibald Napier, 2nd Lord Napier||1645||1660||Died
|-
|Archibald Napier, 3rd Lord Napier||1660||1683||
|-
|Lord Reay (1628)||John Mackay, 2nd Lord Reay||1649||1681||
|-
|Lord Cramond (1628)||Thomas Richardson, 2nd Lord Cramond||1651||1674||
|-
|Lord Forbes of Pitsligo (1633)||Alexander Forbes, 2nd Lord Forbes of Pitsligo||1636||1690||
|-
|rowspan=3|Lord Kirkcudbright (1633)||John Maclellan, 3rd Lord Kirkcudbright||1647||1664||Died
|-
|William Maclellan, 4th Lord Kirkcudbright||1664||1669||
|-
|John Maclellan, 5th Lord Kirkcudbright||1669||1678||
|-
|Lord Fraser (1633)||Andrew Fraser, 2nd Lord Fraser||1636||1674||
|-
|Lord Forrester (1633)||James Baillie, 2nd Lord Forrester||1654||1676||
|-
|Lord Bargany (1641)||John Hamilton, 2nd Lord Bargany||1658||1693||
|-
|rowspan=3|Lord Banff (1642)||George Ogilvy, 1st Lord Banff||1642||1663||Died
|-
|George Ogilvy, 2nd Lord Banff||1663||1668||
|-
|George Ogilvy, 3rd Lord Banff||1668||1713||
|-
|rowspan=2|Lord Elibank (1643)||Patrick Murray, 2nd Lord Elibank||1649||1661||Died
|-
|Patrick Murray, 3rd Lord Elibank||1661||1687||
|-
|rowspan=2|Lord Dunkeld (1645)||James Galloway, 1st Lord Dunkeld||1645||1660||Died
|-
|Thomas Galloway, 2nd Lord Dunkeld||1660||1728||
|-
|Lord Falconer of Halkerton (1646)||Alexander Falconer, 1st Lord Falconer of Halkerton||1646||1671||
|-
|Lord Abercrombie (1647)||James Sandilands, 2nd Lord Abercrombie||1658||1681||
|-
|Lord Belhaven and Stenton (1647)||John Hamilton, 1st Lord Belhaven and Stenton||1647||1679||
|-
|Lord Cochrane of Dundonald (1647)||William Cochrane, Lord Cochrane of Dundonald||1647||1685||Created Earl of Dundonald, see above
|-
|Lord Carmichael (1647)||James Carmichael, 1st Lord Carmichael||1647||1672||
|-
|Lord Duffus (1650)||Alexander Sutherland, 1st Lord Duffus||1650||1674||
|-
|rowspan=2|Lord Rollo (1651)||James Rollo, 2nd Lord Rollo||1659||1669||Died
|-
|Andrew Rollo, 3rd Lord Rollo||1669||1700||
|-
|Lord Ruthven of Freeland (1650)||Thomas Ruthven, 1st Lord Ruthven of Freeland||1651||1673||
|-
|rowspan=3|Lord Rutherfurd (1661)||Andrew Rutherfurd, 1st Lord Rutherfurd||1661||1664||New creation, died
|-
|Thomas Rutherfurd, 2nd Lord Rutherfurd||1664||1668||Died
|-
|Archibald Rutherfurd, 3rd Lord Rutherfurd||1668||1685||
|-
|Lord Bellenden (1661)||William Bellenden, 1st Lord Bellenden||1661||1671||New creation
|-
|Lord Newark (1661)||David Leslie, 1st Lord Newark||1661||1682||New creation
|-
|}

Peerage of Ireland

|Duke of Ormonde (1661)||James Butler, 1st Duke of Ormonde||1661||1688||New creation
|-
|Marquess of Ormonde (1642)||James Butler, 1st Duke of Ormonde||1642||1688||Created Duke of Ormonde, see above
|-
|Marquess of Antrim (1645)||Randal MacDonnell, 1st Marquess of Antrim||1645||1683||
|-
|rowspan=3|Earl of Kildare (1316)||George FitzGerald, 16th Earl of Kildare||1620||1660||Died
|-
|Wentworth FitzGerald, 17th Earl of Kildare||1660||1664||Died
|-
|John FitzGerald, 18th Earl of Kildare||1664||1707||
|-
|rowspan=2|Earl of Waterford (1446)||Francis Talbot, 11th Earl of Waterford||1654||1667||
|-
|Charles Talbot, 12th Earl of Waterford||1667||1718||
|-
|rowspan=2|Earl of Clanricarde (1543)||Richard Burke, 6th Earl of Clanricarde||1657||1666||Died
|-
|William Burke, 7th Earl of Clanricarde||1666||1687||
|-
|Earl of Thomond (1543)||Henry O'Brien, 7th Earl of Thomond||1657||1691||
|-
|Earl of Castlehaven (1616)||James Tuchet, 3rd Earl of Castlehaven||1630||1684||
|-
|Earl of Cork (1620)||Richard Boyle, 2nd Earl of Cork||1643||1698||
|-
|Earl of Westmeath (1621)||Richard Nugent, 2nd Earl of Westmeath||1642||1684||
|-
|Earl of Roscommon (1622)||Wentworth Dillon, 4th Earl of Roscommon||1649||1685||
|-
|Earl of Londonderry (1622)||Weston Ridgeway, 3rd Earl of Londonderry||1641||1672||
|-
|Earl of Meath (1627)||Edward Brabazon, 2nd Earl of Meath||1651||1675||
|-
|Earl of Barrymore (1628)||Richard Barry, 2nd Earl of Barrymore||1642||1694||
|-
|Earl of Carbery (1628)||Richard Vaughan, 2nd Earl of Carbery||1634||1687||
|-
|Earl of Fingall (1628)||Luke Plunkett, 3rd Earl of Fingall||1649||1684||
|-
|rowspan=3|Earl of Downe (1628)||Thomas Pope, 2nd Earl of Downe||1640||1660||Died
|-
|Thomas Pope, 3rd Earl of Downe||1660||1668||Died
|-
|Thomas Pope, 4th Earl of Downe||1668||1668||Died, title extinct
|-
|rowspan=2|Earl of Desmond (1628)||George Feilding, 1st Earl of Desmond||1628||1665||Died
|-
|William Feilding, 2nd Earl of Desmond||1665||1685||
|-
|rowspan=2|Earl of Ardglass (1645)||Wingfield Cromwell, 2nd Earl of Ardglass||1653||1668||Died
|-
|Thomas Cromwell, 3rd Earl of Ardglass||1668||1682||
|-
|Earl of Donegall (1647)||Arthur Chichester, 1st Earl of Donegall||1647||1675||
|-
|rowspan=2|Earl of Cavan (1647)||Charles Lambart, 1st Earl of Cavan||1647||1660||Died
|-
|Richard Lambart, 2nd Earl of Cavan||1660||1690||
|-
|Earl of Clanbrassil (1647)||Henry Hamilton, 2nd Earl of Clanbrassil||1659||1675||
|-
|Earl of Inchiquin (1654)||Murrough O'Brien, 1st Earl of Inchiquin||1654||1674||
|-
|rowspan=3|Earl of Clancarty (1658)||Donough MacCarty, 1st Earl of Clancarty||1658||1665||Died
|-
|Charles MacCarty, 2nd Earl of Clancarty||1665||1666||Died
|-
|Callaghan MacCarty, 3rd Earl of Clancarty||1666||1676||
|-
|Earl of Orrery (1660)||Roger Boyle, 1st Earl of Orrery||1660||1679||New creation
|-
|rowspan=2|Earl of Mountrath (1660)||Charles Coote, 1st Earl of Mountrath||1660||1661||New creation; died
|-
|Charles Coote, 2nd Earl of Mountrath||1661||1672||
|-
|Earl of Tyrconnell (1661)||Oliver FitzWilliam, 1st Earl of Tyrconnell||1661||1667||New creation; died, title extinct
|-
|Earl of Drogheda (1661)||Henry Moore, 1st Earl of Drogheda||1661||1675||New creation
|-
|Earl of Carlingford (1661)||Theobald Taaffe 1st Earl of Carlingford||1661||1677||New creation
|-
|rowspan=2|Earl of Mount Alexander (1661)||Hugh Montgomery, 1st Earl of Mount Alexander||1661||1663||New creation; died
|-
|Hugh Montgomery, 2nd Earl of Mount Alexander||1663||1717||
|-
|Earl of Castlemaine (1661)||Roger Palmer, 1st Earl of Castlemaine||1661||1705||New creation
|-
|Earl of Arran (1662)||Richard Butler, 1st Earl of Arran||1662||1686||New creation
|-
|Viscount Gormanston (1478)||Jenico Preston, 7th Viscount Gormanston||1643||1691||
|-
|Viscount Mountgarret (1550)||Edmund Butler, 4th Viscount Mountgarret||1651||1679||
|-
|rowspan=2|Viscount Grandison (1621)||John Villiers, 3rd Viscount Grandison||1643||1661||Died
|-
|George Villiers, 4th Viscount Grandison||1661||1699||
|-
|Viscount Wilmot (1621)||Henry Wilmot, 3rd Viscount Wilmot||1658||1680||
|-
|rowspan=2|Viscount Valentia (1622)||Francis Annesley, 1st Viscount Valentia||1642||1660||Died
|-
|Arthur Annesley, 2nd Viscount Valentia||1660||1686||Created Earl of Anglesey in the Peerage of England
|-
|Viscount Moore (1621)||Henry Moore, 3rd Viscount Moore||1643||1675||Created Earl of Drogheda, see above
|-
|Viscount Dillon (1622)||Thomas Dillon, 4th Viscount Dillon||1630||1672||
|-
|Viscount Loftus (1622)||Edward Loftus, 2nd Viscount Loftus||1643||1680||
|-
|Viscount Beaumont of Swords (1622)||Thomas Beaumont, 3rd Viscount Beaumont of Swords||1658||1702||
|-
|Viscount Netterville (1622)||Nicholas Netterville, 3rd Viscount Netterville||1659||1689||
|-
|Viscount Montgomery (1622)||Hugh Montgomery, 3rd Viscount Montgomery||1642||1663||Created Earl of Mount Alexander, see above
|-
|Viscount Magennis (1623)||Arthur Magennis, 3rd Viscount Magennis||1639||1683||
|-
|rowspan=3|Viscount Kilmorey (1625)||Charles Needham, 4th Viscount Kilmorey||1657||1660||Died
|-
|Robert Needham, 5th Viscount Kilmorey||1660||1668||Died
|-
|Thomas Needham, 6th Viscount Kilmorey||1668||1687||
|-
|Viscount Baltinglass (1627)||Thomas Roper, 2nd Viscount Baltinglass||1637||1670||
|-
|Viscount Castleton (1627)||George Saunderson, 5th Viscount Castleton||1650||1714||
|-
|Viscount Killultagh (1627)||Edward Conway, 3rd Viscount Killultagh||1655||1683||
|-
|Viscount Mayo (1627)||Theobald Bourke, 4th Viscount Mayo||1652||1676||
|-
|Viscount Sarsfield (1627)||David Sarsfield, 3rd Viscount Sarsfield||1648||1687||
|-
|Viscount Chaworth (1628)||Patrick Chaworth, 3rd Viscount Chaworth||1644||1693||
|-
|Viscount Savile (1628)||James Savile, 2nd Viscount Savile||1659||1671||
|-
|rowspan=2|Viscount Lumley (1628)||Richard Lumley, 1st Viscount Lumley||1628||1663||Died
|-
|Richard Lumley, 2nd Viscount Lumley||1663||1721||
|-
|Viscount Taaffe (1628)||Theobald Taaffe, 2nd Viscount Taaffe||1642||1677||Created Earl of Carlingford, see above
|-
|Viscount Molyneux (1628)||Caryll Molyneux, 3rd Viscount Molyneux||1654||1699||
|-
|Viscount Monson (1628)||William Monson, 1st Viscount Monson||1628||1660||Degraded by Parliament
|-
|Viscount Strangford (1628)||Philip Smythe, 2nd Viscount Strangford||1635||1708||
|-
|Viscount Scudamore (1628)||John Scudamore, 1st Viscount Scudamore||1628||1671||
|-
|rowspan=2|Viscount Wenman (1628)||Thomas Wenman, 2nd Viscount Wenman||1640||1665||Died
|-
|Philip Wenman, 3rd Viscount Wenman||1665||1686||
|-
|rowspan=2|Viscount Ranelagh (1628)||Arthur Jones, 2nd Viscount Ranelagh||1643||1669||Died
|-
|Richard Jones, 3rd Viscount Ranelagh||1669||1711||
|-
|rowspan=2|Viscount FitzWilliam (1629)||Oliver FitzWilliam, 2nd Viscount Fitzwilliam||1650||1667||Died
|-
|William FitzWilliam, 3rd Viscount FitzWilliam||1667||1670||
|-
|Viscount Fairfax of Emley (1629)||Charles Fairfax, 5th Viscount Fairfax of Emley||1651||1711||
|-
|Viscount Ikerrin (1629)||Pierce Butler, 1st Viscount Ikerrin||1629||1674||
|-
|Viscount Clanmalier (1631)||Lewis O'Dempsey, 2nd Viscount Clanmalier||1638||1683||
|-
|rowspan=2|Viscount Cullen (1642)||Charles Cokayne, 1st Viscount Cullen||1642||1661||Died
|-
|Brien Cokayne, 2nd Viscount Cullen||1661||1687||
|-
|rowspan=2|Viscount Carrington (1643)||Charles Smyth, 1st Viscount Carrington||1643||1665||Died
|-
|Francis Smith, 2nd Viscount Carrington||1665||1701||
|-
|rowspan=2|Viscount Tracy (1643)||Robert Tracy, 2nd Viscount Tracy||1648||1662||Died
|-
|John Tracy, 3rd Viscount Tracy||1662||1687||
|-
|Viscount Bulkeley (1644)||Robert Bulkeley, 2nd Viscount Bulkeley||1659||1688||
|-
|Viscount Bellomont (1645)||Charles Rupert Bard, 2nd Viscount Bellomont||1656||1667||Died, title extinct
|-
|Viscount Brouncker (1645)||William Brouncker, 2nd Viscount Brouncker||1645||1684||
|-
|Viscount Ogle (1645)||William Ogle, 1st Viscount Ogle||1645||1682||
|-
|rowspan=2|Viscount Barnewall (1646)||Nicholas Barnewall, 1st Viscount Barnewall||1646||1663||Died
|-
|Henry Barnewall, 2nd Viscount Barnewall||1663||1688||
|-
|rowspan=2|Viscount Galmoye (1646)||Edward Butler, 2nd Viscount of Galmoye||1653||1667||Died
|-
|Piers Butler, 3rd Viscount of Galmoye||1667||1697||
|-
|Viscount Tara (1650)||Thomas Preston, 3rd Viscount Tara||1659||1674||
|-
|rowspan=2|Viscount Massereene (1660)||John Clotworthy, 1st Viscount Massereene||1660||1665||New creation; died
|-
|John Skeffington, 2nd Viscount Massereene||1665||1695||
|-
|Viscount Shannon (1660)||Francis Boyle, 1st Viscount Shannon||1660||1699||New creation
|-
|rowspan=2|Viscount Fanshawe (1661)||Thomas Fanshawe, 1st Viscount Fanshawe||1661||1665||New creation; died
|-
|Thomas Fanshawe, 2nd Viscount Fanshawe||1665||1674||
|-
|Viscount Cholmondeley (1661)||Robert Cholmondeley, 1st Viscount Cholmondeley||1661||1681||New creation
|-
|Viscount Dungan (1662)||William Dongan, 1st Viscount Dungan||1662||1698||New creation
|-
|Viscount Dungannon (1662)||Marcus Trevor, 1st Viscount Dungannon||1662||1670||New creation
|-
|rowspan=2|Viscount Clare (1662)||Daniel O'Brien, 1st Viscount Clare||1662||1666||New creation; died
|-
|Connor O'Brien, 2nd Viscount Clare||1666||1670||
|-
|rowspan=3|Viscount Fitzhardinge (1663)||Charles Berkeley, 1st Viscount Fitzhardinge||1663||1665||New creation; died
|-
|Charles Berkeley, 2nd Viscount Fitzhardinge||1665||1668||Died
|-
|Maurice Berkeley, 3rd Viscount Fitzhardinge||1668||1690||
|-
|Viscount Charlemont (1665)||William Caulfeild, 1st Viscount Charlemont||1665||1671||New creation
|-
|Viscount Powerscourt (1665)||Folliott Wingfield, 1st Viscount Powerscourt||1665||1717||New creation
|-
|Baron Athenry (1172)||Francis de Bermingham, 12th Baron Athenry||1645||1677||
|-
|rowspan=4|Baron Kingsale (1223)||Patrick de Courcy, 20th Baron Kingsale||1642||1663||Died
|-
|John de Courcy, 21st Baron Kingsale||1663||1667||Died
|-
|Patrick de Courcy, 22nd Baron Kingsale||1667||1669||Died
|-
|Almericus de Courcy, 23rd Baron Kingsale||1669||1720||
|-
|rowspan=2|Baron Kerry (1223)||Patrick Fitzmaurice, 19th Baron Kerry||1630||1661||Died
|-
|William Fitzmaurice, 20th Baron Kerry||1661||1697||
|-
|rowspan=2|Baron Slane (1370)||Charles Fleming, 15th Baron Slane||1641||1661||Died
|-
|Randall Fleming, 16th Baron Slane||1661||1676||
|-
|Baron Howth (1425)||William St Lawrence, 12th Baron Howth||1643||1671||
|-
|rowspan=2|Baron Trimlestown (1461)||Matthias Barnewall, 8th Baron Trimlestown||1639||1667||Died
|-
|Robert Barnewall, 9th Baron Trimlestown||1667||1689||
|-
|rowspan=2|Baron Dunsany (1462)||Patrick Plunkett, 9th Baron of Dunsany||1603||1668||Died
|-
|Christopher Plunkett, 10th Baron of Dunsany||1668||1690||
|-
|rowspan=2|Baron Power (1535)||John Power, 5th Baron Power||1607||1661||Died
|-
|Richard Power, 6th Baron Power||1661||1690||
|-
|rowspan=2|Baron Dunboyne (1541)||James Butler, 4th/14th Baron Dunboyne||1640||1662||Died
|-
|Pierce Butler, 5th/15th Baron Dunboyne||1662||1690||
|-
|Baron Louth (1541)||Oliver Plunkett, 6th Baron Louth||1629||1679||
|-
|rowspan=2|Baron Upper Ossory (1541)||Barnaby Fitzpatrick, 6th Baron Upper Ossory||1638||1666||Died
|-
|Barnaby Fitzpatrick, 7th Baron Upper Ossory||1666||1691||
|-
|rowspan=2|Baron Bourke of Castleconnell (1580)||William Bourke, 6th Baron Bourke of Connell||1635||1665||Died
|-
|Thomas Bourke, 7th Baron Bourke of Connell||1665||1680||
|-
|Baron Cahir (1583)||Pierce Butler, 4th Baron Cahir||1648||1676||
|-
|rowspan=2|Baron Hamilton (1617)||George Hamilton, 4th Baron Hamilton of Strabane||1655||1668||Died
|-
|Claud Hamilton, 5th Baron Hamilton of Strabane||1668||1691||
|-
|rowspan=2|Baron Bourke of Brittas (1618)||John Bourke, 2nd Baron Bourke of Brittas||1654||1668||Died
|-
|Theobald Bourke, 3rd Baron Bourke of Brittas||1668||1691||
|-
|rowspan=2|Baron Mountjoy (1618)||Mountjoy Blount, 1st Baron Mountjoy||1618||1665||Died
|-
|Mountjoy Blount, 2nd Baron Mountjoy||1665||1675||
|-
|rowspan=2|Baron Castle Stewart (1619)||Josias Stewart, 4th Baron Castle Stewart||1650||1662||Died
|-
|John Stewart, 5th Baron Castle Stewart||1662||1685||
|-
|Baron Folliot (1620)||Thomas Folliott, 2nd Baron Folliott||1622||1697||
|-
|Baron Maynard (1620)||William Maynard, 2nd Baron Maynard||1640||1699||
|-
|Baron Gorges of Dundalk (1620)||Richard Gorges, 2nd Baron Gorges of Dundalk||1650||1712||
|-
|rowspan=2|Baron Digby (1620)||Kildare Digby, 2nd Baron Digby||1642||1661||Died
|-
|Robert Digby, 3rd Baron Digby||1661||1677||
|-
|Baron Fitzwilliam (1620)||William Fitzwilliam, 3rd Baron Fitzwilliam||1658||1719||
|-
|Baron Caulfeild (1620)||William Caulfeild, 5th Baron Caulfield||1642||1671||Created Viscount Charlemont, see above
|-
|Baron Aungier (1621)||Francis Aungier, 3rd Baron Aungier of Longford||1655||1700||
|-
|rowspan=2|Baron Blayney (1621)||Edward Blayney, 3rd Baron Blayney||1646||1669||Died
|-
|Richard Blayney, 4th Baron Blayney||1669||1670||
|-
|rowspan=2|Baron Brereton (1624)||William Brereton, 2nd Baron Brereton||1631||1664||Died
|-
|William Brereton, 3rd Baron Brereton||1664||1680||
|-
|Baron Herbert of Castle Island (1624)||Edward Herbert, 3rd Baron Herbert of Castle Island||1655||1678||
|-
|Baron Baltimore (1625)||Cecilius Calvert, 2nd Baron Baltimore||1632||1675||
|-
|rowspan=2|Baron Coleraine (1625)||Hugh Hare, 1st Baron Coleraine||1625||1667||Died
|-
|Henry Hare, 2nd Baron Coleraine||1667||1708||
|-
|Baron Sherard (1627)||Bennet Sherard, 2nd Baron Sherard||1640||1700||
|-
|Baron Boyle of Broghill (1628)||Roger Boyle, 1st Baron Boyle of Broghill||1628||1679||Created Earl of Orrery, see above
|-
|Baron Alington (1642)||William Alington, 3rd Baron Alington||1659||1685||
|-
|Baron Hawley (1646)||Francis Hawley, 1st Baron Hawley||1646||1684||
|-
|Baron Kingston (1660)||John King, 1st Baron Kingston||1660||1676||New creation
|-
|Baron Coote (1660)||Richard Coote, 1st Baron Coote||1660||1683||New creation
|-
|Baron Barry of Santry (1661)||James Barry, 1st Baron Barry of Santry||1661||1673||New creation
|-
|Baron Hamilton of Glenawly (1661)||Hugh Hamilton, 1st Baron Hamilton of Glenawly||1661||1679||New creation
|-
|}

References

 

Lists of peers by decade
1660s in England
1660s in Ireland
17th century in England
17th century in Scotland
17th century in Ireland
Lists of 17th-century English people
17th-century Scottish peers
17th-century Irish people
Peers
Peers